Bhooma Batth is a village near Kalaske Cheema and Kot Jehangir in Wazirabad Tehsil, Gujranwala District, Punjab, Pakistan.

Villages in Gujranwala District